Melville is a town in St. Landry Parish, Louisiana, United States. The population was 1,041 at the 2010 census. It is part of the Opelousas−Eunice Micropolitan Statistical Area. It was founded in 1889 and is known as the Atchafalaya River Catfish Capital of Louisiana.

Geography
Melville is located at  (30.693351, −91.745506).

It is mostly flat land surrounded by a ring levee to protect it from flooding from the Atchafalaya River and the West Atchafalaya Floodway.

Climate

Demographics

As of the 2010 United States Census, there were 1,041 people living in the town. The racial makeup of the town was 51.9% Black, 45.0% White, 0.2% Native American, 0.2% Asian and 1.0% from two or more races. 1.8% were Hispanic or Latino of any race.

As of the census of 2000, there were 1,376 people, 542 households, and 363 families living in the town. The racial makeup of the town was 52.47% White, 45.78% African American, 0.87% Asian, and 0.87% from two or more races. Hispanic or Latino of any race were 1.74% of the population.

There were 542 households, out of which 32.3% had children under the age of 18 living with them, 40.6% were married couples living together, 20.8% had a female householder with no husband present, and 33.0% were non-families. 31.0% of all households were made up of individuals, and 15.3% had someone living alone who was 65 years of age or older. The average household size was 2.54 and the average family size was 3.17.

In the town, the population was spread out, with 29.9% under the age of 18, 8.9% from 18 to 24, 24.3% from 25 to 44, 23.2% from 45 to 64, and 13.7% who were 65 years of age or older. The median age was 35 years. For every 100 females, there were 83.5 males. For every 100 females age 18 and over, there were 76.2 males.

The median income for a household in the town was $18,487, and the median income for a family was $20,625. Males had a median income of $22,083 versus $15,833 for females. The per capita income for the town was $8,881. About 35.6% of families and 40.1% of the population were below the poverty line, including 47.2% of those under age 18 and 37.7% of those age 65 or over.

In 2010, Melville had the 12th-lowest median household income of all places in the United States with a population over 1,000.

Notable people

Lottie Beebe, superintendent of public schools in St. Martin Parish and Republican member of the Louisiana Board of Elementary and Secondary Education, was born in Melville in 1953.
LTG Edward Honor Sr., retired lieutenant general of the U.S. Army, serving for 35 years as a Transportation Corps officer and holding the position of director of logistics, Joint Chiefs of Staff at the Pentagon from 1987 until his retirement in 1989. Honor was born on March 17, 1933, in Melville, Louisiana.
Velma Hendrix, mayor, died in a car accident on Election Day, November 8, 2022. She was seeking reelection.

References

External links
 

Towns in Louisiana
Towns in St. Landry Parish, Louisiana